KTOU-LD, virtual and UHF digital channel 22, is a low-power beIN Sports Xtra-affiliated television station licensed to Oklahoma City, Oklahoma, United States. The station is owned by Innovate Corp.

In June 2013, KTOU-LD was slated to be sold to Landover 5 as part of a larger deal involving 51 other low-power television stations; the sale fell through in June 2016. Mako Communications sold its stations, including KTOU-LD, to Innovate Corp in 2017.

Subchannels
The station's digital signal is multiplexed:

References

External links

TOU-LD
Television channels and stations established in 1993
Low-power television stations in the United States
Innovate Corp.
LX (TV network) affiliates